Zawadki may refer to the following places:
Zawadki, Biała Podlaska County in Lublin Voivodeship (east Poland)
Zawadki, Tomaszów Lubelski County in Lublin Voivodeship (east Poland)
Zawadki, Masovian Voivodeship (east-central Poland)